Neck of the Woods (released Aug 27, 2012 in Oslo, Norway by the label Edition Records –  EDN1034 is an album by the Norwegian saxophonist Marius Neset together with the tubaist Daniel Herskedal.

Reception 
The review by Terje Mosnes of the Norwegian newspaper Dagbladet awarded the album 4 stars (dice), the review by John Fordham of the British newspaper The Guardian awarded the album 3 stars, and the reviewer Ian Mann of the Jazz Mann awarded the album 4 stars

Review 
The album Neck of the Woods is an album that increases its appeal with repeated listening. Neset and Herskedal guides us into a mysterious brass landscape that is rich of surprises.

The critique Terje Mosnes of the Norwegian newspaper Dagbladet, in his review of Neset's album Neck of the Woods states:

The Guardian critique John Fordham, in his review of the album Neck of the Woods states:

The All About Jazz critique Ian Patterson, in his review of the album Neck of the Woods states:

Track listing 
All compositions by Daniel Herskedal & Marius Neset except where other are noted
Neck Of The Woods (5:33)
Preludium (2:27)
Lutra Lutra (2:50)
Eg Er Framand (5:54) - traditional
The Shepherd (0:59)
Ara's Dance (4:24)
The Christmas Song (4:32)
Dragon's Eye (2:53)
Introduction To Swan Island (1:56)
Swan Island (5:21)
The Wedding (4:00) - composed by Abdullah Ibrahim

Personnel 
Marius Neset - saxophone
Daniel Herskedal - tuba

Additional musicians
Hallvar Djupvik - vocal solo (track # 4)
Svanholm Singers - choir

Credits 
Recorded by August Wanngren
Mixed & Masered by August Wanngren
Design & cower photo by Darren Rumney
Additional photo by Enok Holsegård
Produced by Marius Neset & Daniel Herskedal
Executive producer Dave Stapleton

Notes 
Recorded at
Fredriksberg Kirke (Copenhagen, DK) December 2010
Kulturskolan I Lund (Lund, SE) February 2011
We Know Music Studios (Copenhagen, DK) June 2011 and May 2012
Mixed and mastered in
We Know Music Studios

References

External links 

Marius Neset albums
Edition Records albums
2012 albums